Ionuț Adrian Cioinac (born 14 January 1991) is a Romanian professional footballer who plays as a midfielder for Viitorul Dăești. A versatile player, Cioinac plays mainly as a mainly as a defensive midfielder, but he has also been deployed on numerous occasions as a centre-back.

Club career

After spending the first half of his career in the lower tiers of Romanian football, Cioinac made his Liga I debut while on loan at Dinamo București, on February 23, 2014, in 1–2 loss to Viitorul Constanța. At the end of the 2013–14 Liga I season he was released by Dinamo and returned to Fortuna Brazi.

Pandurii Târgu Jiu
After another two seasons in the Liga II, Cioinac returned to the top tier of Romanian football to sign with struggling Pandurii Târgu Jiu. Although he impressed here, Pandurii were relegated and the player soon left the club.

Politehnica Iași
Cioinac followed his departing manager from Pandurii Târgu Jiu, Flavius Stoican, and signed a one-year contract with fellow Liga I club Politehnica Iași. After a very strong first year with the Moldavian team in which they finished the league on sixth place, he signed another contract to keep him with the club for another two years.

Honours
CSM Reșița
Liga III: 2021–22

References

External links
 
 

1991 births
Living people
Sportspeople from Craiova
Romanian footballers
Association football midfielders
FCM Dunărea Galați players
ASA 2013 Târgu Mureș players
FC Dinamo București players
FCV Farul Constanța players
CS Pandurii Târgu Jiu players
FC Politehnica Iași (2010) players
FC Petrolul Ploiești players
AFC Turris-Oltul Turnu Măgurele players
SSU Politehnica Timișoara players
FC Unirea Constanța players
Liga I players
Liga II players
Liga III players